Richard Cannon Erwin (August 23, 1923 – November 7, 2006) was a United States district judge of the United States District Court for the Middle District of North Carolina and politician who was the first African American to be elected to statewide office in North Carolina.

Education and career

Born in Marion, North Carolina, Erwin served in the United States Army during World War II, from 1943 to 1946, achieving the rank of Sergeant. He received a Bachelor of Arts degree from Johnson C. Smith University in 1947, and a Bachelor of Laws from Howard University School of Law in 1951. While at Johnson C. Smith University, Erwin was a member of the Alpha Epsilon chapter of Kappa Alpha Psi fraternity. He was in private practice in Winston-Salem, North Carolina from 1951 to 1977. Erwin served on his local school board in Winston-Salem from 1961 to 1968, on the North Carolina State Board of Education from 1971 to 1977, and was elected to two terms in the North Carolina Senate as a Democrat. In 1977, Governor Jim Hunt appointed him to the North Carolina Court of Appeals. In 1978, the voters of the state elected him to continue as an Appeals Court judge, thus making him the first African American statewide official actually elected by its voters.

Federal judicial service

On June 11, 1980, Erwin was nominated by President Jimmy Carter to a new seat on the United States District Court for the Middle District of North Carolina created by 92 Stat. 1629. He was confirmed by the United States Senate on September 29, 1980, and received his commission on September 30, 1980, thereby becoming the first black federal judge in North Carolina. Erwin served as Chief Judge from 1988 until he assumed senior status on September 22, 1992. He served in that capacity until his death on November 7, 2006, in Winston-Salem.

See also 
 List of African-American federal judges
 List of African-American jurists
 List of first minority male lawyers and judges in North Carolina

References

Sources
 
 NC Bar Association: Judge Richard Erwin, Former NCBA VP, Dies

1923 births
2006 deaths
African-American state legislators in North Carolina
African-American judges
North Carolina Court of Appeals judges
Judges of the United States District Court for the Middle District of North Carolina
Johnson C. Smith University alumni
United States district court judges appointed by Jimmy Carter
20th-century American judges
Democratic Party North Carolina state senators
North Carolina lawyers
Howard University School of Law alumni
People from Marion, North Carolina
United States Army personnel of World War II